Thomas Hutson Gregorie (September 27, 1807 – January 7, 1886) was an American physician and politician.

Gregorie was born in Beaufort, South Carolina on September 27, 1807, and died in Grahamville, Beaufort County, South Carolina, January 7, 1886, in his 79th year.  He graduated from Yale College in 1828.  He received the degree of M.D. from the Medical College in Charleston, in 1831, and began the practice of his profession in St. Luke's Parish, in his native county, where he obtained a large and lucrative business. Besides his professional services to the parish, he represented it in the South Carolina State Legislature for several years.

He married in July 1845, Martha H. Gillison, who survived him with six daughters and two sons, having lost three children in infancy.

External links

1807 births
1886 deaths
People from Beaufort, South Carolina
Yale College alumni
Medical University of South Carolina alumni
Physicians from South Carolina
Members of the South Carolina General Assembly
19th-century American politicians